Luis Hernández Heres (born 24 August 1949) is a Cuban former footballer who competed in the 1976 Summer Olympics.

International career
He represented his country in two games at the 1976 Summer Olympics.

Football administration
Subsequently, he became a businessman and football administrator, and a member of the FIFA Council, the main decision-making body of FIFA, the governing body of association football.

Hernández was elected to the FIFA Council in May 2016, as one of three representatives of the Confederation of North, Central America and Caribbean Association Football (CONCACAF).

References

1949 births
Living people
Association football midfielders
Cuban footballers
Olympic footballers of Cuba
Footballers at the 1976 Summer Olympics
Cuban businesspeople
FIFA officials
Pan American Games medalists in football
Pan American Games bronze medalists for Cuba
Footballers at the 1971 Pan American Games
Medalists at the 1971 Pan American Games